Governor Knowles State Forest is a 19,753 acre (79.9 km²) unit of the Wisconsin state park system that stretches for  along the St. Croix River.  It is managed as a wilderness buffer for the Saint Croix National Scenic Riverway.  On the east the state forest is bordered by county forests and two state wildlife areas.  Originally called the St. Croix River State Forest, it was renamed in 1981 to honor former Wisconsin governor Warren P. Knowles for his conservation and outdoorsman ethics.

External links
Governor Knowles State Forest official site

1970 establishments in Wisconsin
Protected areas of Burnett County, Wisconsin
Protected areas of Polk County, Wisconsin
Wisconsin state forests
Protected areas established in 1970